Piratini is a city in the Brazilian state of Rio Grande do Sul with a population of some 21,000.  It is the former capital of the short-lived Riograndense Republic which was proclaimed on September 11, 1836.

References

Municipalities in Rio Grande do Sul
Capitals of former nations